Lilly Dale is an unincorporated community in Anderson Township, Perry County, in the U.S. state of Indiana.

History
A post office was established at Lilly Dale in 1855, and remained in operation until it was discontinued in 1918.

Geography

References

Unincorporated communities in Perry County, Indiana
Unincorporated communities in Indiana